In telecommunications and fiber optics, a plastic-clad silica fiber or polymer-clad silica fiber (PCS) is an optical fiber that has a silica-based core and a plastic cladding. The cladding of a PCS fiber should not be confused with the polymer overcoat of a conventional all-silica fiber.

Usage
The main applications of plastic-clad silica fiber are industrial, medical or sensing applications where cores that are larger than those used in standard data communications fibers are advantageous.

PCS fibers in general have significantly lower performance characteristics, particularly higher transmission losses and lower bandwidths, than all-glass fibers.

See also
Plastic optical fiber
Hard-clad silica optical fiber

References

External links
Fiber Optic Drop Cable

Optical fiber